Pyotr Nikolayevich Gorlov (11 May 1839 in Irkutsk, Irkutsk Governorate, Russian Empire – 20 November 1915) was a geologist and engineer who explored coal deposits in the Donets Basin, the Caucasus, Central Asia and Ussuri Krai. He founded the city of Horlivka; the city has a monument in honor of him.

References

External links
 Article with picture of the monument

1839 births
1915 deaths
Deaths from pneumonia in Russia
Engineers from the Russian Empire
Geologists from the Russian Empire
People from Irkutsk
People from Irkutsk Governorate
Recipients of the Order of St. Anna, 2nd class
Recipients of the Order of Saint Stanislaus (Russian), 2nd class
Russian city founders
Saint Petersburg Mining University alumni